The 1891 Primera División was the first ever Argentine championship making Argentina's the oldest football league outside Continental Europe. This tournament was organized by the Argentine Association Football League whose president was F.L. Wooley. This league only lasted one season, so in 1892 no championship was held. In 1893 other Association with the same name would be established by Alexander Watson Hutton becoming current Argentine Football Association.

The championship took the format of a league of 5 teams, with each team playing the other twice. Many of the results of individual games have been lost, hence the lack of goals for and against in the table below. Hurlingham registered in the tournament but did not take part of the same.

At the end of the season, St. Andrew's and Old Caledonians finished at the top position with 13 points each. They were declared joint champions, but played a playoff match to decide which team got to keep the medals, being St. Andrew's the winner. 

The current Association has not included this title in their documents, except in its web page where only St. Andrew's is listed as champion.

Final standings

Medal match 
As the Association crowned both, St. Andrew's and Old Caledonians as champion, this match was held only to determine which team got to keep the medals.

References

Argentine Primera División seasons
1891 in South American football
1891 in Argentine football